Flaming Teeth, from Fijian mythology, was a giant who was so large his teeth appeared as burning logs.

The giant tormented villages day after day, eating people and wreaking havoc. After so much burning and consuming of villagers a band of brave men from the village got together. They made a plan to surprise and ambush the giant by luring it under a giant rock and smashing its skull with it. They succeeded killing the giant but its teeth still were aflame. The villagers took the teeth back to the village and that was the first time man acquired the use of fire.

References

External links
Macula.tv's cartoon illustration of Flaming Teeth

Fijian mythology
Giants
Melanesian legendary creatures